Albert Atkinson (1909–1953) was an English rugby player.

Albert Atkinson may also refer to:

A. K. Salim (Albert Atkinson, born 1922), American alto-saxophonist and arranger
Albert Atkinson (baseball) (1861–1952), American baseball player
Bert Atkinson, EastEnders character

See also